This is a timeline documenting events of Jazz in the year 1965.

Events

July
 1 – The 12th Newport Jazz Festival started in Newport, Rhode Island (July 1 – 4).

Unknown dates
 Ronnie Scott's Jazz Club opens in larger premises at 47 Frith Street, in London's Soho district.
 Carla Bley divorced Paul Bley.

Album releases

Andrew Hill: Compulsion
Archie Shepp: Fire Music
Ben Webster: Stormy Weather 
Bobby Hutcherson: Components
Bobby Hutcherson: Dialogue
Don Cherry: Complete Communion
Eddie Palmieri: Mozambique
Frank Wright: Frank Wright Trio
Gabor Szabo: Gypsy
George Finola: Jazz Of The Chosen Few
Herbie Hancock: Maiden Voyage
Horace Silver: The Cape Verdean Blues
Horace Silver: Song for My Father
John Coltrane: A Love Supreme
John Coltrane: The John Coltrane Quartet Plays
Lee Morgan: Cornbread 
Lee Morgan: The Gigolo
Marion Brown: Marion Brown Quartet
Milford Graves: Percussion Ensemble
Wes Montgomery: Bumpin' (album)
New York Art Quartet: Mohawk
Ornette Coleman: Chappaqua Suite
Patty Waters: Sings
Prince Lasha: Inside Story 
Roland Kirk: Rip, Rig and Panic
Roswell Rudd: Roswell Rudd
Sam Rivers: Contours
Sun Ra: The Heliocentric Worlds of Sun Ra, Volume Two
Sun Ra: The Magic City
Vince Guaraldi: A Charlie Brown Christmas
Wayne Shorter: The All Seeing Eye
Wayne Shorter: Soothsayer

Standards

Deaths

 January
 29 – Jack Hylton, English pianist, composer, band leader, and impresario (born 1892).

 February
 12 – Bonnie Wetzel, American upright bassist (born 1926).
 15 – Nat King Cole, American pianist and singer (born 1919).

 March
 8 – Tadd Dameron, American composer, arranger, and pianist (born 1917).

 May
 1 – Spike Jones, American musician and bandleader (born 1911).
 14 – Joe Sanders, American pianist, singer, and bandleader (born 1896).
 24 – Denzil Best, American percussionist and composer (born 1917).

 June
 25 – Keg Purnell, American drummer (born 1915).

 July
 1 – Claude Thornhill, American pianist, arranger, composer, and bandleader (born 1909).
 4 – Valdemar Eiberg, Danish musician and orchestra leader (born 1892).
 8 – Willie Dennis, American trombonist (born 1926).
 14 – Spencer Williams, African-American pianist, singer, and composer (born 1889).

 August
 10 – Freddie Slack, American pianist, composer, and bandleader (born 1910).

 September
 15 – Steve Brown, American upright bassist (born 1896).

 October
 10 – Gerorge Tucker, American upright bassist (born 1927).
 27 – Edythe Wright, American singer (born 1914).
 28 – Earl Bostic, American alto saxophonist (born 1913).

 November
 6 – Clarence Williams, American pianist, vocalist, and composer (born 1898).
 14 – Buster Harding, Canadian-born American pianist (born 1912).
 18 – Lou Black, American banjo player (born 1901).
 21 – Cecil Brower, American violinist (perforated ulcer) (born 1914).
 Warren Tartaglia, American saxophonist (born 1944).

 December
 2 – Hank D'Amico, American clarinetist (born 1915).
 11 – Dave Barbour, American guitarist (born 1912).
 20 – Charlie Burse, American  ukulele, banjo, and guitar player (born 1901).
 26 – Peter Packay, Belgian trumpeter, arranger, and composer (born 1904).

Births

 January
 1 – Miki Higashino, Japanese pianist and video game composer.
 3 – Sheila Majid, Malaysian singer.
 19 – Antonio Faraò, Italian pianist.

 February
 13 – Ole Mathisen, Norwegian saxophonist.
 24 – Tone Åse, Norwegian singer.
 27 – Joey Calderazzo, American pianist.

 March
 2 – Wolfgang Muthspiel, Austrian guitarist and record label owner.
 8 – Karin Mensah, Cape Verdean singer.
 12 – Liv Stoveland, Norwegian singer.
 22 – David Linx, Belgian singer and songwriter.
 24 – Patrick Scales, British-German bass guitarist.

 April
 7 – Sylvain Luc, French guitarist.
 10 – Omar Sosa, Cuban composer, bandleader, and pianist.
 20 – Darko Jurković, Croatian guitarist and composer.
 29 – Rain Sultanov, Azerbaijani saxophonist.

 May
 3 – Magnus Öström, Swedish drummer, Esbjörn Svensson Trio or e.s.t.
 10 – Philip Harper, American trumpeter.
 16 – Javon Jackson, American tenor saxophonist.

 June
 3
 Derrick Gardner, American trumpeter.
 Mirko Fait, Italian saxophonist and composer.
 9 – Helge Sunde, Norwegian trombonist and multi-instrumentalist.
 27 – Magnus Broo, Swedish trumpeter, Atomic.

 July
 5 – Eyran Katsenelenbogen, Israeli pianist.
 16 – Odd André Elveland, Norwegian saxophonist.
 19 – Evelyn Glennie, Scottish percussionist.
 28 – Delfeayo Marsalis, American trombonist and record producer.

 August
 4 – Terri Lyne Carrington, American drummer, composer, singer, record producer, and entrepreneur.
 6 – Ravi Coltrane, American saxophonist.
 29 – Mark d'Inverno, British pianist, composer, and computer scientist.

 September
 5 – Björn Meyer, Swedish bassist and composer.
 11 – Jesse Davis, American saxophonist.
 24 – Njål Ølnes, Norwegian saxophonist.
 28 – Hans Ulrik, Danish saxophonist, and composer.

 October
 9 – Geir Lysne, Norwegian saxophonist and orchestra leader.
 12 – Luis Bonilla, American trombonist, producer, composer and educator.
 18 – Curtis Stigers, American vocalist, saxophonist, guitarist, and songwriter.

 November
 2 – Andrew D'Angelo, American saxophonist.
 10 – Mark Turner, American saxophonist.
 21 – Björk, Icelandic singer-songwriter.

 December
 5 – Hildegunn Øiseth, Norwegian trumpeter and hornist.
 7 – Wolfgang Haffner, German drummer.
 29 – Danilo Perez, Panamanian pianist and composer.
 30 – Ron Affif, American guitarist.

 Unknown date
 Arturo Tappin, Barbadian saxophonist and composer.
 Bradley Joseph, American pianist.
 Helge Andreas Norbakken, Norwegian percussionist.
 Kostas Theodorou, Greek upright bassist, multi-instrumentalist, and composer.

See also

 1960s in jazz
 List of years in jazz
 1965 in music

References

Bibliography

External links 
 History Of Jazz Timeline: 1965 at All About Jazz

Jazz
Jazz by year